The 1988 Coupe de France Final was a football match held at Parc des Princes, Paris on June 11, 1988, that saw FC Metz defeat FC Sochaux-Montbéliard in a penalty shoot out. After normal time and extra-time could not separate the two sides, the match was to be decided on penalty kicks. Mickaël Madar from FC Sochaux-Montbéliard was the only one to miss his penalty.

Match details

See also
Coupe de France 1987-88

External links
Coupe de France results at Rec.Sport.Soccer Statistics Foundation
Report on French federation site

Coupe
1988
Coupe De France Final 1988
Coupe De France Final 1988
Coupe de France Final 1988
Coupe de France Final
Coupe de France Final